Gimdi is one of former Village Development Committee of Lalitpur, Nepal. The village is around 80 kilometer away from Kathmandu. It lies in Ward No. 7 of Bagmati Rural Municipality, Lalitpur Province No. 3 of central Nepal. According to National Population Census, 2299 people who lived of 461 household in Nepal in 2011. It has touched the border of Mahankal Rural Municipality of Lalitpur and Bagmati Rural Municipality of Makwanpur District.

References

External links
UN map of the municipalities of Lalitpur District

Populated places in Lalitpur District, Nepal